Swiss German (Standard German: , , and others) is any of the Alemannic dialects spoken in the German-speaking part of Switzerland and in some Alpine communities in Northern Italy bordering Switzerland. Occasionally, the Alemannic dialects spoken in other countries are grouped together with Swiss German as well, especially the dialects of Liechtenstein and Austrian Vorarlberg, which are closely associated to Switzerland's.

Linguistically, Alemannic is divided into Low, High and Highest Alemannic, varieties all of which are spoken both inside and outside Switzerland. The only exception within German-speaking Switzerland is the municipality of Samnaun, where a Bavarian dialect is spoken. The reason Swiss German dialects constitute a special group is their almost unrestricted use as a spoken language in practically all situations of daily life, whereas the use of the Alemannic dialects in other countries is restricted or even endangered.

The Swiss German dialects must not be confused with Swiss Standard German, the variety of Standard German used in Switzerland. Swiss Standard German is fully understandable to all Standard German speakers, while many people in Germany – especially in the north – do not understand German Swiss (people with any of the many Swiss German dialects as mother language). An interview with a German Swiss shown on German national television therefore requires subtitles, much as an interview in Scots would on US television. Although Swiss German is the native language in the German-speaking part of Switzerland, Swiss school students additionally learn Swiss Standard German at school from age six. They are thus capable of understanding, writing and speaking Standard German, with varying abilities mainly based on the level of education.

Use
Unlike most regional languages in modern Europe, Swiss German is the spoken everyday language for the majority of all social levels, in industrial cities as well as in the countryside. Using a dialect conveys neither social nor educational inferiority and is done with pride.  

In 2014, about 87% of the people living in the German-speaking portion of Switzerland were using a dialect in their everyday lives.

The Swiss Amish of Adams County, Indiana, and their daughter settlements also use a form of Alemannic.

Variation and distribution
Swiss German is a regional or political umbrella term, not a linguistic unity. For all Swiss-German dialects, there are idioms spoken outside Switzerland that are more closely related to them than to some other Swiss-German dialects. The main linguistic divisions within Swiss German are those of Low, High and Highest Alemannic, and mutual intelligibility across those groups is almost fully seamless, despite some differences in vocabulary. Low Alemannic is only spoken in the northernmost parts of Switzerland, in Basel and around Lake Constance. High Alemannic is spoken in most of the Swiss Plateau, and is divided in an eastern and a western group. Highest Alemannic is spoken in the Alps.

Low Alemannic:
Basel German in Basel-Stadt (BS), closely related to Alsatian
High Alemannic:
Western:
Bernese German, in the Swiss Plateau parts of Bern (BE)
Dialects of Basel-Landschaft (BL)
Dialects of Solothurn (SO)
Dialects of the western part of Aargau (AG)
In a middle position between eastern and western:
Dialects in the eastern part of Aargau (AG)
Dialects of Lucerne (LU)
Dialects of Zug (ZG)
Zürich German, in Zürich (ZH)
Eastern:
Dialects of St. Gallen (SG)
Dialects of Appenzell (AR & AI)
Dialects of Thurgau (TG)
Dialects of Schaffhausen (SH)
Dialects in parts of Graubünden (GR)
Highest Alemannic:
Dialects in parts of Canton of Fribourg (FR)
Dialects of the Bernese Oberland (BE)
Dialects of Unterwalden (OW & NW) and Uri (UR)
Dialects of Schwyz (SZ)
Dialects of Glarus (GL)
Walliser German in parts of the Valais (VS)
Walser German: due to the medieval migration of the Walser, Highest Alemannic spread to pockets of what are now parts of northern Italy (Piedmont), the north-west of Ticino (TI), parts of Graubünden (GR), Liechtenstein and Vorarlberg.

One can separate each dialect into numerous local subdialects, sometimes down to a resolution of individual villages. Speaking the dialect is an important part of regional, cantonal and national identities. In the more urban areas of the Swiss plateau, regional differences are fading due to increasing mobility and to a growing population of non-Alemannic background. Despite the varied dialects, the Swiss can still understand one another, but may particularly have trouble understanding Walliser dialects.

History
There are, however, exceptions, namely the idioms of Chur and Basel.

Examples:

The High German consonant shift happened between the 4th and 9th centuries south of the Benrath line, separating High German from Low German, where high refers to the geographically higher regions of the German-speaking area of those days (combining Upper German and Central German varieties - also referring to their geographical locations). North of the Benrath line up to the North Sea, this consonant shift did not happen.

The Walser migration, which took place between the 12th and 13th centuries, spread upper Wallis varieties towards the east and south, into Grisons and even further to western Austria and northern Italy. Informally, a distinction is made between the German-speaking people living in the canton of Valais, the Walliser, and the migrated ones, the Walsers (to be found mainly in Graubünden, Vorarlberg in Western Austria, Ticino in South Switzerland, south of the Monte Rosa mountain chain in Italy (e.g. in Issime in the Aosta valley), Tirol in North Italy, and Allgäu in Bavaria).

Generally, the Walser communities were situated on higher alpine regions, so were able to stay independent of the reigning forces of those days, who did not or were not able to follow and monitor them all the time necessary at these hostile and hard to survive areas. So, the Walser were pioneers of the liberalization from serfdom and feudalism. And, Walser villages are easily distinguishable from Grisonian ones, since Walser houses are made of wood instead of stone.

Phonology

Consonants

Like all other Southern German dialects, Swiss German dialects have no voiced obstruents. Traditionally, that distinction is said to be a distinction of fortis and lenis, but it has been claimed to be a distinction of quantity.

Swiss German keeps the fortis–lenis opposition at the end of words. There can be minimal pairs such as   'straight' and   'arête' or bis  'be (imp.)' and   'bite'. That distinguishes Swiss German and Swiss Standard German from German Standard German, which neutralizes the fortis–lenis opposition at the ends of words. The phenomenon is usually called final-obstruent devoicing even though, in the case of German, phonetic voice may not be involved.

Swiss German  are not aspirated. Aspirated  have (in most dialects) secondarily developed by combinations of prefixes with word-initial  or by borrowings from other languages (mainly Standard German):  'keep' (standard German  );  'tea' (standard German  );  'salary' (standard German  ). In the dialects of Basel and Chur, aspirated  is also present in native words. All typically voiced consonant sounds are voiceless.

Unlike Standard German, Swiss German  does not have the allophone  but is typically , with allophones . The typical Swiss shibboleth features this sound:  ('kitchen cupboard'), pronounced .

Most Swiss German dialects have gone through the Alemannic n-apocope, which has led to the loss of final -n in words such as  'garden' (standard German ) or  'to make' (standard German ). In some Highest Alemannic dialects, the n-apocope has also been effective in consonant clusters, for instance in  'horn' (High Alemannic ) or  'to think' (High Alemannic ). Only the Highest Alemannic dialects of the Lötschental and of the Haslital have preserved the -n.

The phoneme  is pronounced as an alveolar trill  in many dialects, but some dialects, especially in the Northeast or in the Basel region, have a uvular trill , and other allophones resulting in fricatives and an approximant as [] like in many German varieties of Germany.

In Bernese German, an [] can be pronounced as a []. It may also be pronounced this way when occurring towards the end of a syllable.

A labiodental approximant  is used in Bernese German, as the  sound is present in Standard German. In Walser German, it is realized as a labiodental fricative [].

Vowels

Most Swiss German dialects have rounded front vowels, unlike other High German dialects. Only in Low Alemannic dialects of northwestern Switzerland (mainly Basel) and in Walliser dialects have rounded front vowels been unrounded. In Basel, rounding is being reintroduced because of the influence of other Swiss German dialects.

Like Bavarian dialects, Swiss German dialects have preserved the opening diphthongs of Middle High German: : in  'lovely' (standard German  but pronounced );  'hat' (standard German  );  'cool' (Standard German  ). Some diphthongs have become unrounded in several dialects. In the Zürich dialect, short pronunciations of // are realized as []. Sounds like the monophthong  can frequently become unrounded to  among many speakers of the Zürich dialect. Vowels such as a centralized [] and an open-mid [] only occur in the Bernese dialect.

Like in Low German, most Swiss German dialects have preserved the old West-Germanic monophthongs :  'arrow' (Standard German  );  'belly' (Standard German  );  'pillar' (Standard German  ). A few Alpine dialects show diphthongization, like in Standard German, especially some dialects of Unterwalden and Schanfigg (Graubünden) and the dialect of Issime (Piedmont).

Zürich German, and some other dialects distinguish primary diphthongs from secondary ones that arose in hiatus: Zürich German  from Middle High German  versus Zürich German  from Middle High German ; Zürich German  'leg, woman' from Middle High German ,  versus Zürich German  'free, building' from Middle High German , .

Suprasegmentals
In many Swiss German dialects, consonant length and vowel length are independent from each other, unlike other modern Germanic languages. Here are examples from Bernese German:

Lexical stress is more often on the first syllable than in Standard German, even in French loans like  or  'thanks' (despite stress falling on the final syllable in French). However, there are many different stress patterns, even within dialects. Bernese German has many words that are stressed on the first syllable:  'casino' while Standard German has . However, no Swiss German dialect is as consistent as Icelandic in that respect.

Grammar
The grammar of Swiss dialects has some idiosyncratic features in comparison to Standard German:

There is no preterite indicative (yet there is a preterite subjunctive).
The preterite is replaced by perfect constructs (this also happens in spoken Standard German, particularly in Southern Germany and Austria).
It is still possible to form pluperfect phrases, by applying the perfect construct twice to the same sentence.
There is no genitive case, though certain dialects have preserved a possessive genitive (for instance in rural Bernese German). The genitive case is replaced by two constructions: The first of these is often acceptable in Standard German as well: possession + Prp.  (Std. German ) + possessor:  vs. Standard German  ('a book of a professor'),  vs. Standard German  ('the professor's book'). The second is still frowned on where it appears in Standard German (from dialects and spoken language): dative of the possessor + the possessive pronoun referring to the possessor + possession:  ('the professor his book').
The order within verb groups may vary, e.g.  vs. Standard German  'when you have come/came'. In fact, dependencies can be arbitrarily cross-serial, making Swiss German one of the few known non-context-free natural languages.
All relative clauses are introduced by the relative particle  ('where'), never by the relative pronouns  as in Standard German, e.g.  vs. Standard German  ('the example that she writes');  vs. Standard German  ('the example that she thinks of'). Whereas the relative particle  replaces the Standard German relative pronouns in the Nom. (subject) and Acc. (direct object) without further complications, in phrases where  plays the role of an indirect object, a prepositional object, a possessor or an adverbial adjunct it has to be taken up later in the relative clause by reference of (prp. +) the personal pronoun (if  refers to a person) or the pronominal adverb (if  refers to a thing). E.g.  ('the professor whose book I showed you'),  ('the mountain that we were upon').

Reduplication verbs

Overview 
In Swiss German, a small number of verbs reduplicate in a reduced infinitival form, i.e. unstressed shorter form, when used in their finite form governing the infinitive of another verb. The reduced and reduplicated part of the verb in question is normally put in front of the infinitive of the second verb. This is the case for the motion verbs  'to go' and  'to come' when used in the meaning of 'go (to) do something', 'come (to) do something', as well as the verbs  'to let' and in certain dialects  'to start, to begin' when used in the meaning of 'let do something', or 'start doing something'.

Declarative sentence examples: 

As the examples show, all verbs are reduplicated with a reduced infinitival form when used in a declarative main clause. This is especially interesting as it stands in contrast to the standard variety of German and other varieties of the same, where such doubling effects are not found as outlined in the examples.

: weakest doubling effects 
Reduplication effects are weaker in the verbs  'to let' and  'to start, to begin' than they are in  'to go' and  'to come'. This means that  is most likely to be used without its reduplicated and reduced form while retaining grammaticality, whereas utterances with goo are least likely to remain grammatical without the reduplicated part.

The reason for this is unknown, but it has been hypothesized that the fact that afaa has a separable prefix (a-) might weaken its doubling capacity. The presence of this separable prefix also makes the boundaries between the reduced infinitival reduplication form and the prefix hard if not impossible to determine.

In this case, the prefix would be omitted, which is normally not permissible for separable prefixes, and in its place, the reduplication form is used. 

Meanwhile,  is not reduplicated when used in a subordinate clause or in the past tense. In such instances, doubling would result in ungrammaticality: 

Past tense example with : 

The same is true for subordinate clauses and the verb : 

Subordinate clause examples with : 

In order to achieve grammaticality in both instances, the reduced doubling part  would have to be taken out.

and optionality of reduplication 
While  'to start, to begin' is quite restricted when it comes to reduplication effects, the phenomenon is more permissive, but not mandatory in the verb  'to let'. While present tense declarative sentences are generally ungrammatical when  remains unduplicated, this is not true for past tense and subordinate clauses, where doubling effects are optional at best:

Past tense example with : 

Subordinate clause example with : 
 

In the use of this form, there are both geographical and age differences. Reduplication is found more often in the western part of Switzerland than in the eastern part, while younger generations are much more inclined to leave out reduplication, which means that the phenomenon is more widespread in older generations.

and : stronger reduplication 
Ungrammaticality in reduplication of  'to start, to begin' in the past tense and in subordinate clauses as well as the somewhat more lenient use of reduplication with  'to let' stand in contrast to doubling effects of the motion verbs  'to go' and  'to come'. When the latter two verbs are used in other utterances other than a declarative main clause, where the finite verb traditionally is in second position, their use might not be mandatory; however, it is correct and grammatical to double them both in the past tense and in subordinate clauses:

 

As outlined in both examples, the reduplicated form of both  and  can but does not have to be used in order for the past tense sentences to be grammatical.Notably, it is the reduced form of both verbs that is necessary, not the full participle form.

 

The same is true for the past tense.

Questions 
Questions behave a lot like their declarative counterparts, and reduplication is therefore mandatory for both motion verbs  'to go' and  'to come', while  'to let' and  'to start, to begin' show weaker doubling effects and more optionality. Furthermore, this is the case for both open and close (yes/no) questions. Consider the following examples:

 in open and close questions:

Just like in declarative forms,  could be reduced to a- and thus be considered the detachable prefix. In this case,  would no longer be a reduplicated verb, and that is where the language development seems to move towards.

 in open and close questions: 
 

 and especially , however, do not allow for their reduced doubling part to be left out in questions, irrespective of the fact whether they are open or close:

 in open and close questions: 
 

 in open and close questions:

Imperative mood 
In the imperative mood, just like in questions,  'to go' and  'come' are very strict in their demand for doubling. The same is true for  'to let'; it is ungrammatical to use it in imperative mood undoubled. On the other hand,  leaves a lot more room for the speaker to play with. Speakers accept both sentences with only the detachable prefix and no doubling, and sentences with the full doubled form.

Imperative mood: 
 

Imperative mood: 

Imperative mood: 

Imperative mood:

In the case of the verb  'to come', there are situations when instead of it being reduplicated with its reduced form , the doubled short form of  'to go', is used instead.

Declarative main clause, present tense
 

Declarative main clause past tense 

Subordinate clause

Imperative mood

With the motion verbs  'to go' and  'to come', where reduplication effects are strongest, there is some variation regarding their reduplicated or reduced forms. However, these forms are used less frequently than their shorter counterparts and seem to be concentrated into a small geographic area of Switzerland.

Vocabulary 
The vocabulary is varied, especially in rural areas: many specialized terms have been retained, e.g., regarding cattle or weather. In the cities, much of the rural vocabulary has been lost.

Most word adoptions come from Standard German. Many of these are now so common that they have totally replaced the original Swiss German words, e.g. the words  'hill' (instead of),  'lip' (instead of ). Others have replaced the original words only in parts of Switzerland, e.g.,  'butter' (originally called  in most of Switzerland). Virtually any Swiss Standard German word can be borrowed into Swiss German, always adapted to Swiss German phonology.

Swiss dialects have quite a few words from French and Italian, which are perfectly assimilated. Standard German's  and ). Possibly, these words are not direct adoptions from French but survivors of the once more numerous French loanwords in Standard German, many of which have fallen out of use in Germany.

These words are probably not direct loanwords from English but have been adopted through standard German intermediation. While most of those loanwords are of recent origin, some have been in use for decades, e.g. ('to play football', from shoot).

There are also a few English words which are modern adoptions from Swiss German. The dishes müesli, and rösti have become English words, as did loess (fine grain), flysch (sandstone formation), kepi, landammann, kilch, and putsch in a political sense. The term  is sometimes explained as originating from Swiss German, while printed etymological dictionaries (e.g. the German Kluge or Knaurs Etymological Dictionary) derive it from Low German instead.

Orthography

History 
Written forms that were mostly based on the local Alemannic varieties, thus similar to Middle High German, were only gradually replaced by the forms of New High German. This replacement took from the 15th to 18th centuries to complete. In the 16th century, the Alemannic forms of writing were considered the original, truly Swiss forms, whereas the New High German forms were perceived as foreign innovations. The innovations were brought about by the printing press and were also associated with Lutheranism. An example of the language shift is the Froschauer Bible: Its first impressions after 1524 were largely written in an Alemannic language, but since 1527, the New High German forms were gradually adopted. The Alemannic forms were longest preserved in the chancelleries, with the chancellery of Bern being the last to adopt New High German in the second half of the 18th century.

Today all formal writing, newspapers, books and much informal writing is done in Swiss Standard German, which is usually called  (written German). Certain dialectal words are accepted regionalisms in Swiss Standard German and are also sanctioned by the Duden, e.g.,  (afternoon snack). Swiss Standard German is virtually identical to Standard German as used in Germany, with most differences in pronunciation, vocabulary, and orthography. For example, Swiss Standard German always uses a double s (ss) instead of the eszett (ß).

There are no official rules of Swiss German orthography. The orthographies used in the Swiss-German literature can be roughly divided into two systems: Those that try to stay as close to standard German spelling as possible and those that try to represent the sounds as well as possible. The so-called  was developed by Eugen Dieth, but knowledge of these guidelines is limited mostly to language experts. In 1986, a revised version of the Dieth-Schreibung was published, designed to be typed with a regular typewriter.

Conventions 
A few letters are used differently from the Standard German rules:
 (and ) are used for the affricate .
 is used for the unaspirated fortis .
This usage goes back to an old ij-ligature. Many writers, however, do not use , but /, especially in the dialects that have lost distinction between these sounds, compare Zürich German   'rice' or 'giant' to Bernese German   'rice' vs.   ('giant').
 represents ,  represents , and  represents .

Literature
Since the 19th century, a considerable body of Swiss German literature has accumulated. The earliest works were in Lucerne German (Jost Bernhard Häfliger, Josef Felix Ineichen), in Bernese German (Gottlieb Jakob Kuhn), in Glarus German (Cosimus Freuler) and in Zürich German (Johann Martin Usteri, Jakob Stutz); the works of Jeremias Gotthelf which were published at the same time are in Swiss Standard German, but use many expressions of Bernese German. Some of the more important dialect writing authors and their works are:

Anna Maria Bacher (born 1947),  (South Walser German of Formazza/Pomatt)
Albert Bächtold (1891–1981),  (Schaffhausen dialect of Klettgau)
Ernst Burren (born 1944),  (Solothurn dialect)
August Corrodi (1826–1885),  (Zurich dialect)
Barbara Egli (1918–2005),  (Zurich Oberland dialect)
Fritz Enderlin (1883–1971), translated from C. F. Ramuz's French poem "" (Upper Thurgovian dialect)
Martin Frank (born 1950),  (Bernese dialect with Zurich interferences)
Simon Gfeller (1868–1943),  (Bernese dialect of Emmental)
Georg Fient (1845–1915),  (Graubünden Walser dialect of Prättigau)
Paul Haller (1882–1920),  (Western Aargau dialect)
Frida Hilty-Gröbli (1893–1957),  (St Gall dialect)
Josef Hug (1903–1985),  (Graubünden Rhine Valley dialect)
 Guy Krneta (born 1964),  (collection of short stories),  (prose),  (Bernese dialect)
Michael Kuoni (1838–1891),  (Graubünden Walser dialect of Prättigau)
Maria Lauber (1891–1973),  (Bernese Oberland dialect)
Pedro Lenz (born 1965),  (Bernese Dialect)
Meinrad Lienert (1865–1933),  (Schwyz dialect of Einsiedeln)
Carl Albert Loosli (1877–1959),  (Bernese dialect of Emmental)
Kurt Marti (born 1921),  (Bernese dialect)
Werner Marti (1920–2013),  (Bernese dialect)
Mani Matter (1936–1972), songwriter (Bernese dialect)
Traugott Meyer (1895–1959),  (Basel-Landschaft dialect)
Gall Morel (1803–1872),  (Schwyz German of Iberg)
Viktor Schobinger (born 1934),  and a lot of other Züri Krimi (Zurich dialect)
Caspar Streiff (1853–1917),  (Glarus dialect)
Jakob Stutz (1801–1877),  (Zurich Oberland dialect)
Rudolf von Tavel (1866–1934),  (Bernese dialect)
Alfred Tobler (1845–1923),  (Appenzell dialect)
Johann Martin Usteri (1763–1827),  (Zurich German)
Hans Valär (1871–1947),  (Graubünden Walser dialect of Davos)
Bernhard Wyss (1833–1889),  (Solothurn dialect)

Parts of the Bible were translated in different Swiss German dialects, e.g.:

  (Bernese New Testament, translated by Hans and Ruth Bietenhard, 1989)
  (parts of the Old Testament in Bernese dialect, translated by Hans and Ruth Bietenhard, 1990)
  (Psalms in Bernese dialect, translated by Hans, Ruth and Benedikt Bietenhard, 1994)
  (Zurich German New Testament, translated by Emil Weber, 1997)
  (Psalms in Zurich German, translated by Josua Boesch, 1990)
  (parts of the Old and the New Testament in Basel dialect, 1981)
  (Gospel of Mark in Lucerne dialect, translated by Walter Haas, 1988)
  (Gospel of Mark in the Obwalden dialect, translated by Karl Imfeld, 1979)

See also 
Argentinien-schwyzertütsch dialect
Swiss French
Swiss Italian
Swiss Standard German
Linguistic geography of Switzerland

Notes

References

Bibliography 
 Albert Bachmann (ed.), Beiträge zur schweizerdeutschen Grammatik (BSG), 20 vols., Frauenfeld: Huber, 1919–1941.
 
 Rudolf Hotzenköcherle (ed.), Beiträge zur schweizerdeutschen Mundartforschung (BSM), 24 vols., Frauenfeld: Huber, 1949–1982.
 Rudolf Hotzenköcherle, Robert Schläpfer, Rudolf Trüb (ed.), Sprachatlas der deutschen Schweiz. Bern/Tübingen: Francke, 1962–1997, vol. 1–8. – Helen Christen, Elvira Glaser, Matthias Friedli (ed.), Kleiner Sprachatlas der deutschen Schweiz. Frauenfeld: Huber, 2010 (and later editions), . 
 Verein für das Schweizerdeutsche Wörterbuch (ed.), Schweizerisches Idiotikon: Wörterbuch der schweizerdeutschen Sprache. Frauenfeld: Huber; Basel: Schwabe, 17 vols. (16 complete), 1881–, .

External links 

Chochichästli-Orakel – choose the Swiss German words you would normally use and see how well this matches the dialect of your area. 
Dialekt.ch a site with sound samples from different dialects. 
Schweizerisches Idiotikon The homepage of the Swiss national dictionary.
One poem in 29 Swiss dialects  
Zürich's Swiss German morphology and lexicon

Alemannic German language
Upper German languages
German dialects
Languages of Switzerland
Diglossia